Felipa de Souza (1556, Portugal – 1600, Brazil) was a woman who had romantic relationships with other women during the Brazilian colonial era. She was accused of sodomy and because of that she fell victim of the Catholic Inquisition.

Her name was adopted by the OutRight Action International (formerly known as International Gay and Lesbian Human Rights Commission) to name its annual human rights prize.


Sources

Notes

References 
Luiz Mott: O Lesbianismo no Brasil, Mercado Aberto (Brazil), 1987,

External links
The Felipa de Souza Award Winners

1556 births
1600 deaths
People from Tavira
16th-century Brazilian LGBT people
Brazilian lesbians
LGBT history in Portugal
People prosecuted under anti-homosexuality laws
Social history of Brazil
17th-century Brazilian women
16th-century Brazilian women
Victims of the Inquisition